Christopher Hodges is an artist and director of Utopia Art Sydney a contemporary art gallery in Australia.

Artistic career 
Hodges studied art at the Alexander Mackie CAE graduating with a Dip Art (Ed) and first began exhibiting his work in the late 1970s.  His first solo exhibition was at Coventry Gallery, Sydney in 1979, and he has held over 30 solo exhibitions since then.

Over his career, Hodges has worked in painting, drawing, printing and sculpture. Much of his work, across mediums, has been interested in organic geometry: "I have done a lot of works that use geometry but at the same time I have done a lot of works with what looks like repeated forms when, in fact, every curve is different. So I guess, a kind of organic geometry is actually what I am aiming at, sort of like nature."

Major public sculpture commissions include 'Flower for a Friend' (2010), at St Vincent's Hospital, Sydney, and 'The White Flower' (2009) commissioned by the Mosman Municipal Council for Hunter Park, Balmoral.

Gallery career 
Hodges is the director of Utopia Art Sydney, which he founded in 1988. Utopia Art Sydney is committed to the representation of a small group of  Australian and international artists, including leading indigenous artists such as Emily Kame Kngwarreye and members of Papunya Tula Artists such as Ronnie Tjampitjinpa and Makinti Napanangka.  Over the years, Hodges has written extensively on indigenous Australian art, and has consulted for exhibitions such as 'Emily Kame Kngwarreye: Alhalkere - paintings from Utopia'.

References 

Australian curators
Living people
Year of birth missing (living people)